The Pest County Assembly is the local legislative body of Pest County, in the Central Hungary in Hungary.

Composition

2019
The Assembly elected at the 2019 local government elections, is made up of 44 counselors, with the following party composition:

|-
|colspan=8 align=center| 
|-
! colspan="2" | Party
! Votes
! %
! +/-
! Seats 
! +/-
! Seats %
|-
| bgcolor=| 
| align=left | Fidesz–KDNP
| align=right| 220,290
| align=right| 51.60
| align=right| 2.70
| align=right| 24
| align=right| 1
| align=right| 54.55
|-
| bgcolor=| 
| align=left | Momentum Movement (Momentum)
| align=right| 83,768
| align=right| 19.62
| align=right| 
| align=right| 9
| align=right| 9
| align=right| 20.45
|-
| bgcolor=| 
| align=left | Democratic Coalition (DK)
| align=right| 63,618
| align=right| 14.90
| align=right| 6.59
| align=right| 7
| align=right| 3
| align=right| 15.91
|-
| bgcolor=| 
| align=left | Jobbik
| align=right| 39,478
| align=right| 9.25
| align=right| 8.99
| align=right| 4
| align=right| 4
| align=right| 9.09
|-
! colspan=8|
|-
| bgcolor=| 
| align=left | Hungarian Socialist Party (MSZP)
| align=right| 19,746
| align=right| 4.63
| align=right| 7.49
| align=right| 0
| align=right| 5
| align=right| 0
|-
! align=right colspan=2| Total
! align=right| 444,115
! align=right| 100.0
! align=right| 
! align=right| 44
! align=right| 1
! align=right| 
|-
! align=right colspan=2| Voter turnout
! align=right| 
! align=right| 45.29
! align=right| 4.12
! align=right| 
! align=right| 
! align=right| 
|}

After the elections in 2019 the Assembly controlled by the Fidesz–KDNP party alliance which has 44 councillors, versus 9 Momentum Movement, 7 Democratic Coalition (DK) and 4 Jobbik councillors.

2014
The Assembly elected at the 2014 local government elections, is made up of 43 counselors, with the following party composition:

|-
! colspan="2" | Party
! Votes
! %
! +/-
! Seats 
! +/-
! Seats %
|-
| bgcolor=| 
| align=left | Fidesz–KDNP
| align=right| 183,277
| align=right| 48.90
| align=right| 9.84
| align=right| 23
| align=right| 3
| align=right| 53.49
|-
| bgcolor=| 
| align=left | Jobbik
| align=right| 68,381
| align=right| 18.24
| align=right| 1.58
| align=right| 8
| align=right| 1
| align=right| 18.60
|-
| bgcolor=| 
| align=left | Hungarian Socialist Party (MSZP)
| align=right| 45,440
| align=right| 12.12
| align=right| 12.48
| align=right| 5
| align=right| 5
| align=right| 11.63
|-
| bgcolor=| 
| align=left | Democratic Coalition (DK)
| align=right| 31,155
| align=right| 8.31
| align=right| 
| align=right| 4
| align=right| 4
| align=right| 9.30
|-
| bgcolor=| 
| align=left | Politics Can Be Different (LMP)
| align=right| 30,050
| align=right| 8.02
| align=right| 
| align=right| 3
| align=right| 3
| align=right| 6.98
|-
! colspan=8|
|-
| bgcolor=#FED500| 
| align=left | Together (Együtt)
| align=right| 16,499
| align=right| 4.40
| align=right| 
| align=right| 0
| align=right| ±0
| align=right| 0
|-
! align=right colspan=2| Total
! align=right| 389,020
! align=right| 100.0
! align=right| 
! align=right| 43
! align=right| 0
! align=right| 
|-
! align=right colspan=2| Voter turnout
! align=right| 
! align=right| 41.17
! align=right| 3.43
! align=right| 
! align=right| 
! align=right| 
|}

After the elections in 2014 the Assembly controlled by the Fidesz–KDNP party alliance which has 23 councillors, versus 8 Jobbik, 5 Hungarian Socialist Party (MSZP), 4 Democratic Coalition (DK) and 3 Politics Can Be Different (LMP) councillors.

2010
The Assembly elected at the 2010 local government elections, is made up of 43 counselors, with the following party composition:

|-
! colspan="2" | Party
! Votes
! %
! +/-
! Seats 
! +/-
! Seats %
|-
| bgcolor=| 
| align=left | Fidesz–KDNP
| align=right| 230,611
| align=right| 58.74
| align=right| .
| align=right| 26
| align=right| 17
| align=right| 60.47
|-
| bgcolor=| 
| align=left | Hungarian Socialist Party (MSZP)
| align=right| 96,590
| align=right| 24.60
| align=right| .
| align=right| 10
| align=right| 18
| align=right| 23.26
|-
| bgcolor=| 
| align=left | Jobbik
| align=right| 65,391
| align=right| 16.66
| align=right| 
| align=right| 7
| align=right| 7
| align=right| 16.28
|-
! align=right colspan=2| Total
! align=right| 410,779
! align=right| 100.0
! align=right| 
! align=right| 43
! align=right| 37
! align=right| 
|-
! align=right colspan=2| Voter turnout
! align=right| 
! align=right| 44.60
! align=right| 
! align=right| 
! align=right| 
! align=right| 
|}

After the elections in 2010 the Assembly controlled by the Fidesz–KDNP party alliance which has 26 councillors, versus 10 Hungarian Socialist Party (MSZP) and 7 Jobbik councillors.

Presidents of the Assembly
So far, the presidents of the Pest County Assembly have been:

 1990–1994 János Inczédy, Christian Democratic People's Party (KDNP)
 1994–1998 Géza Schmidt, KÖSZ
 1998–2002 András T. Mészáros, Fidesz
 2002–2006 Imre Szabó, Hungarian Socialist Party (MSZP)
 2006–2014 Lajos Szűcs, Fidesz–KDNP
 since 2014 István Szabó, Fidesz–KDNP

References

Local government in Hungary
Pest County